Tommy Kinsella (born 1941 in Dublin, died 6 February 2009) was an Irish soccer player who played in the League of Ireland during the 1960s.

Kinsella played for Shamrock Rovers and Bohemians amongst others during his career in the League of Ireland. He also had a spell with Arsenal. Tommy Kinsella was eventually transferred from Drumcondra to Arsenal, during the 1960/61 season, and ended up spending two years at the London club. He played mostly for the reserves, although he scored for the Arsenal first team at Dalymount Park during a match celebrating the new lights.

Joined The Hoops in March 1967  and scored his first goal on 1 October. Went on to make 4 appearances for Rovers in European competition. He also played for Dundalk in Europe, featuring against Liverpool in the 1969-70 Fairs Cup competition.

Honours
FAI Cup: 2
  Shamrock Rovers - 1967, 1969
Irish Cup
 Glentoran 1966
 Coleraine F.C. 1965
  President's Cup
 Shamrock Rovers 1968/69

Republic of Ireland association footballers
League of Ireland players
Lisburn Distillery F.C. players
Coleraine F.C. players
Shamrock Rovers F.C. players
Bohemian F.C. players
Drogheda United F.C. players
NIFL Premiership players
Glentoran F.C. players
United Soccer Association players
Boston Rovers players
Dundalk F.C. players
1941 births
2009 deaths
Drumcondra F.C. players
Irish League representative players
Association football forwards